In optimization, a gradient method is an algorithm to solve problems of the form 

with the search directions defined by the gradient of the function at the current point. Examples of gradient methods are the gradient descent and the conjugate gradient.

See also

 Gradient descent
 Stochastic gradient descent
 Coordinate descent
 Frank–Wolfe algorithm
 Landweber iteration
 Random coordinate descent
 Conjugate gradient method
 Derivation of the conjugate gradient method
 Nonlinear conjugate gradient method
 Biconjugate gradient method
 Biconjugate gradient stabilized method

References
 

First order methods
Optimization algorithms and methods
Numerical linear algebra